Duck House, part of the Richards estate, was a historic dwelling and is an archaeological site on Cumberland Island near St. Marys, Georgia. It was added to the National Register of Historic Places on February 13, 1984, and burned down a few years later from a fire started by an illegal camper.

During World War II the U.S. Coast Guard was stationed at Duck House. There is a Duck House Road and a Duck House Trail on the island.

Campgrounds were proposed for the Duck House area but ecological concerns scuttled the idea.

See also
Dungeness (Cumberland Island, Georgia)

References

National Register of Historic Places in Cumberland Island National Seashore
 Cumberland Island National Seashore
Houses in Camden County, Georgia
Ruins in the United States
Vernacular architecture in Georgia (U.S. state)